Fiorina Cecchin (3 April 1877 – 13 November 1925) – in religious Maria Carola – was an Italian Roman Catholic professed religious in the Sisters of Saint Giuseppe Benedetto Cottolengo. Ill health prevented an initial entrance into the religious life when she was eighteen before she was accepted into the Cottolengo Sisters in Treviso; it was upon her religious profession that she worked as a cook for her colleagues before she was given permission to join the missions in Africa where she arrived in 1905. Cecchin became a popular figure in the missions due to her care and attentiveness towards the poor and the sick with whom she spent a great deal of time with. She was noted for her zealous activism and the manner in which she educated children in catechism.

The beatification process commenced in Turin in 2014 and she became titled as a Servant of God. Cecchin was beatified on 5 November 2022 in Meru after a miracle attributed to her from 2013 received papal approval.

Life
Fiorina Cecchin was born on 3 April 1877 in Cittadella in the Padua province as the fifth of eight children born to Francesco Cecchin and Antonia Geremia. Her eldest two siblings both died as infants.

Cecchin attempted to join the Suore di Santa Dorotea in Vicenza but was rejected on the basis of her fragile health. However, her parish priest and spiritual director provided her with assistance and secured her a place in the Sisters of Saint Giuseppe Benedetto Cottolengo at their house in Bigolino in Treviso when she was nineteen. On 27 August 1896, Cecchin began her period as a postulant at the Little House of Divine Providence in Turin (she was the 139th postulant that year) and then commenced her novitiate period on 2 October 1897 (taking the habit on 3 October and the religious name "Maria Carola") before she made her solemn religious profession on 6 January 1899. Following her profession, she was appointed as a cook first at the boarding school that the order managed at Giaveno and then at the motherhouse in Turin, however, she longed to join the missions in Africa as it was a longstanding ambition that she held, indeed, submitting a formal request to her superiors to enter the missions on 19 March 1904.

In 1905, she received her wish when was dispatched to Kenya alongside four of her colleagues and two nuns from the Consolata Missionaries, departing on 28 January 1905 (the third expedition of nuns to the African continent) from Trieste, receiving the missionary cross before her departure from the Cardinal Archbishop of Turin Agostino Richelmy. Upon their arrival in Mombasa after a two-week journey, the sisters were asked to manage the mission stations and were told that it was important to understand how to best teach catechism and practice medicine, while availing themselves to teach reading and writing to children. Despite the series of difficulties that she would face in this period, amongst them the differences in climate, standard of living, culture and language, Cecchin and her colleagues were able to collaborate with the Consolata Missionaries and learn together alongside them. Soon enough, Cecchin was able to study the Kikuyu language and could eventually communicate far more fluently than when she first arrived. First stationed in Limuru and then at Tuthu, she was also sent to Iciagaki, Mugoiri, Wambogo, and then finally to Tigania in Meru. Each time she relocated to another place, she established a small house for those nuns that would arrive after her, and she sought to make it habitable by creating a vegetable garden and creating a small courtyard. Known for her zeal in promoting the Gospel, she worked tirelessly to teach catechism, not just to children, but to the older population. The majority of her time was spent tending to the poor and the ill. However, World War I also had repercussions that spread to Africa, with Cecchin tending to soldiers at military hospitals, and later tending to those who suffered from the Spanish flu after the war ended. Cecchin was later appointed as the regional superior and she fell seriously ill at her last community placement in Tigania, diagnosed as sanguine enterocolitis, which caused her great pain until her death. However, her trials were only further exacerbated after the fruitful collaboration with the Consolata Missionaries noticeably soured from 1923 due to differences in the style of evangelization amongst others. Following several unsuccessful attempts by the order's superiors, Pope Benedict XV decided to end the situation by formally ordering the repatriation of the Cottolengo sisters in Kenya, ensuring that the Vicar Apostolic of Kenya Filippo Perlo carry out the request and inform the sisters. Cecchin oversaw their departure, being the last of the 44 sisters (she left with just one other colleague) to leave on 25 October 1925, despite her seriously ill state.

Cecchin died on board the steamship Porto Alessandretta on 13 November 1925 in the Red Sea between Massawa and Suez. Her remains were never interred because, due to hygiene regulations at that time, her remains were wrapped in a simple white sheet and buried at sea after a hasty funeral could be organized.

Beatification
The beatification process launched on 28 February 2013 after the Congregation for the Causes of Saints issued the official "nihil obstat" (no objections) decree that permitted the Turin archdiocese to launch the diocesan investigation into her life and holiness once it transferred the beatification forum from the Meru diocese to the Turin archdiocese. The diocesan investigation opened on 24 April 2014 in a Mass that Archbishop Cesare Nosiglia celebrated before the same archbishop presided over the conclusion of the process just a few months later on 7 October. The C.C.S. in Rome issued a decree on 28 May 2015 that validated the process that affirmed that all evidence had been presented to them and that the Turin archdiocese had carried out the process per the regulations that the C.C.S. set.

The postulation (the officials that manage the cause) lodged the official "Positio" dossier with the C.C.S. in 2017 to be assessed hence the commencement of the "Roman Phase". Historians assessed and approved the cause on 10 October 2017 before nine theologians likewise issued their approval on 4 February 2020. The cardinal and bishop members of the C.C.S. issued their final approval on 10 November 2020. Pope Francis declared Cecchin to be Venerable on 23 November 2020 after he determined that she had led a model life of heroic virtue according to the cardinal and theological virtues. Francis later approved a 2013 miracle attributed to her intercession in a decree on 13 December 2021 that would enable for Cecchin to be beatified in Meru on 5 November 2022; Cardinal Antoine Kambanda presided over the rite on the pope's behalf.

The current postulator for this cause is Sr. Antonietta Bosetti S.S.G.B.C.

During the Wednesday General Audience on 9th November 2022, Pope Francis asked the audience to give a round of applause for the new Blessed Maria Carola, noting that her example as a "wise and good woman, sustains many who work hard in spreading the reign of God."

References

External links
Hagiography Circle
Congregation for the Causes of Saints

1877 births
1925 deaths
19th-century Italian Roman Catholic religious sisters and nuns
19th-century venerated Christians
20th-century Italian educators
20th-century Italian Roman Catholic religious sisters and nuns
20th-century venerated Christians
Beatifications by Pope Francis
Italian beatified people
Italian educators
Italian expatriates in Kenya
Italian Roman Catholic missionaries
People from Cittadella
Religious leaders from Padua
Roman Catholic medical missionaries
Roman Catholic missionaries in Kenya
Venerated Catholics by Pope Francis
Italian women nurses